One Court Square, also known as the Citigroup Building, is a 50-story  office tower in Long Island City, Queens across the East River from Manhattan in New York City. It was completed in 1989 by Skidmore, Owings & Merrill LLP for Citigroup. The building stood as Queens's tallest from its completion until the topping out of Skyline Tower in 2019.

Design 
One Court Square was designed by Skidmore, Owings and Merrill and is owned by Savanna. The building has a green-tinted glass-wrapped facade, and rises 50 stories above ground, with 54 stories total. It has 27 passenger elevators, 4 freight elevators, and 6 escalators. The interior contains 1,401,630 rentable square feet (130,203 square meters).

The tower had been the tallest building in New York state outside of Manhattan, and the tallest building on Long Island for 29 years. In 2019, the building was surpassed by the Brooklyn Point Tower and the Skyline Tower in height to be demoted to the third tallest building on Long Island, and the second tallest building in Queens.

It is distinguished from the Citigroup Center in Manhattan, which is across the street from Citigroup's former main headquarters at 399 Park Avenue. The buildings are one stop apart on the New York City Subway's IND Queens Boulevard Line; Citigroup Center is near Lexington Avenue–53rd Street, while One Court Square is right above Court Square–23rd Street, the next station east.

History 
One Court Square opened in 1989.

Citigroup sold the building in 2005. In 2012, Brooklyn real estate investors Joel Schreiber and David Werner purchased One Court Square for $481 million from Stephen L. Green's SL Green and JPMorgan Asset Management. In 2020, the Citi logo was removed from the building and replaced with a logo of telecommunications company Altice USA, a tenant.

Tenants 
WNYZ-LD (also known as Voice of NY Radio Korea) broadcasts from the top of this building as do various low power television stations.

Since 2017, the building has housed the headquarters of Altice on its top floors.

In 2018 the building was selected to provide up to 25 floors to Amazon as part of one of its three Amazon HQ2 locations. However, the Amazon HQ2 location in New York City was later canceled.

See also
List of tallest buildings in New York City
List of tallest buildings in Queens

References

External links
 
 
 One Court Square

Bank buildings in New York City
Skyscrapers in Queens, New York
Citigroup buildings
Long Island City
Office buildings completed in 1989
Skidmore, Owings & Merrill buildings
Skyscraper office buildings in New York City
Privately owned public spaces
Commercial buildings in Queens, New York
1989 establishments in New York City